Artursson is a surname. Notable people with the surname include:

Greger Artursson (born 1972), Swedish ice hockey player
Nicoline Artursson (born 1993), Swedish fashion model

Swedish-language surnames